Miljan Radović is a retired Montenegrin footballer who played as a midfielder. He is well-known for his accurate set pieces that often led to beautiful goals. He is also nicknamed 'The Professor' because of his quick, well-timed passes and entertaining skills.

Playing career

Club
Born in Nikšić (SR Montenegro, SFR Yugoslavia), he started his career in 1993 by playing with the local club FK Sutjeska Nikšić where in 7 seasons he made over 250 league appearances and scored over 30 goals. In 2000, he moved to FK Vojvodina also competing in the First League of FR Yugoslavia.

In 2003, he signed with NK Šmartno 1928 plating in the Slovenian First League.  He later played with OFK Grbalj, FK Mogren, FK Lovćen and OFK Petrovac in the Montenegrin First League before moving abroad again, in 2011, by signing with Persib Bandung in the Indonesia Super League.

Honours

Club honors
Mogren
Montenegrin Cup (1): 2007–08

Statistics

Managerial Statistics

References

1975 births
Living people
Footballers from Nikšić
Association football midfielders
Serbia and Montenegro footballers
Montenegrin footballers
FK Sutjeska Nikšić players
FK Vojvodina players
NK Šmartno ob Paki players
OFK Grbalj players
FK Mogren players
FK Lovćen players
OFK Petrovac players
Persib Bandung players
Pelita Bandung Raya players
Second League of Serbia and Montenegro players
First League of Serbia and Montenegro players
Slovenian PrvaLiga players
Montenegrin First League players
Liga 1 (Indonesia) players
Serbia and Montenegro expatriate footballers
Expatriate footballers in Slovenia
Serbia and Montenegro expatriate sportspeople in Slovenia
Montenegrin expatriate footballers
Expatriate footballers in Indonesia
Montenegrin expatriate sportspeople in Indonesia
Montenegrin football managers
Persib Bandung managers
FK Sutjeska Nikšić managers
Montenegrin expatriate football managers
Expatriate football managers in Indonesia